The SPAD S.XXII was a prototype fighter plane built by SPAD shortly World War I.

Design and development
The S.XXII was a two-seat biplane fighter of all-wood construction with a canvas coating and a monocoque fuselage. The upper and lower wings tended to sweep in opposite directions.

Specifications

References

Fighter aircraft
Biplanes
1910s French fighter aircraft
S.XXII
Single-engined tractor aircraft
Aircraft first flown in 1919